This is a list of the 87 provincial electoral districts (also informally known as ridings in Canadian English) of British Columbia, Canada, as defined by the 2015 electoral redistribution, which first came into effect for the 2017 British Columbia general election.

Electoral districts are constituencies that elect members of the Legislative Assembly (MLAs) to the Legislative Assembly of British Columbia every election.

Abbotsford-Mission
Abbotsford South
Abbotsford West
Boundary-Similkameen
Burnaby-Deer Lake
Burnaby-Edmonds
Burnaby-Lougheed
Burnaby North
Cariboo-Chilcotin
Cariboo North
Chilliwack
Chilliwack-Kent
Columbia River-Revelstoke
Coquitlam-Burke Mountain
Coquitlam-Maillardville
Courtenay-Comox
Cowichan Valley
Delta North
Delta South
Esquimalt-Metchosin
Fraser-Nicola
Kamloops-North Thompson
Kamloops-South Thompson
Kelowna-Lake Country
Kelowna-Mission
Kelowna West
Kootenay East
Kootenay West
Langford-Juan de Fuca
Langley
Langley East
Maple Ridge-Mission
Maple Ridge-Pitt Meadows
Mid Island-Pacific Rim
Nanaimo
Nanaimo-North Cowichan
Nechako Lakes
Nelson-Creston
New Westminster
North Coast
North Island
North Vancouver-Lonsdale
North Vancouver-Seymour
Oak Bay-Gordon Head
Parksville-Qualicum
Peace River North
Peace River South
Penticton
Port Coquitlam
Port Moody-Coquitlam
Powell River-Sunshine Coast
Prince George-Mackenzie
Prince George-Valemount
Richmond North Centre
Richmond-Queensborough
Richmond South Centre 
Richmond-Steveston
Saanich North and the Islands
Saanich South
Shuswap
Skeena
Stikine
Surrey-Cloverdale
Surrey-Fleetwood
Surrey-Green Timbers
Surrey-Guildford
Surrey-Newton
Surrey-Panorama
Surrey South
Surrey-Whalley
Surrey-White Rock
Vancouver-Fairview
Vancouver-False Creek
Vancouver-Fraserview
Vancouver-Hastings
Vancouver-Kensington
Vancouver-Kingsway
Vancouver-Langara
Vancouver-Mount Pleasant
Vancouver-Point Grey
Vancouver-Quilchena
Vancouver-West End
Vernon-Monashee
Victoria-Beacon Hill
Victoria-Swan Lake
West Vancouver-Capilano
West Vancouver-Sea to Sky

See also
 Defunct districts

External links
Electoral maps

 
British Columbia, provincial
Electoral districts, provincial